William J. McColgan (died April 30, 1973) was an American sportscaster.

A native of Boston, McColgan graduated from St. Margaret's School and South Boston High School. After serving in the U.S. Navy during World War II, he attended Curry College.

Over the course of his career he worked for WFMJ in Youngstown, [WHKW|WGAR]]/WGAR-FM in Cleveland, WTOP/WTOP-FM/WTOP-TV in Washington D.C., and WWL/WWL-TV in New Orleans. He served as the play-by-play announcer for the Cleveland Browns (1954–1960), Cleveland Indians (1958–1960), Washington Redskins (1961–1963), and the New Orleans Saints (1971–1972). He also called games for the Cleveland Barons of the American Hockey League, as well as Ohio State and Maryland football.

McColgan died on April 30, 1973 in New Orleans of a heart attack. He was 47 years old.

References

1973 deaths
American Hockey League broadcasters
American people of Irish descent
American radio sports announcers
Catholics from Massachusetts
Cleveland Browns announcers
Cleveland Indians announcers
College football announcers
Curry College alumni
Major League Baseball broadcasters
Maryland Terrapins football announcers
National Football League announcers
New Orleans Saints announcers
Ohio State Buckeyes football announcers
People from Dorchester, Massachusetts
Radio personalities from Youngstown, Ohio
Radio personalities from Cleveland
Radio personalities from New Orleans
Radio personalities from Washington, D.C.
Sportspeople from Boston
United States Navy personnel of World War II
Washington Redskins announcers
Year of birth missing
South Boston High School alumni